Diego Alejandro Tamayo Martínez (born 19 September 1983) is a Colombian former road cyclist.

Major results
2007
 6th Clásica Memorial Txuma
 7th Overall Vuelta a Navarra
2008
 1st  Overall Vuelta a Navarra
1st Stage 5
2009
 8th Grand Prix de Plumelec-Morbihan
 10th Memorial Marco Pantani
2011
 1st Circuit de Wallonie 
2012
 1st  Overall Vuelta a Toledo
2015 
 1st  Overall Titan Desert

References

1983 births
Living people
Colombian male cyclists
People from Caldas Department